Events from the year 1867 in art.

Events
 Exposition Universelle in Paris helps popularize Japanese woodblock prints in the West.
 Engravings of William Holman Hunt's The Finding of the Saviour in the Temple by Auguste III Blanchard are published by dealer Ernest Gambart in London in editions totalling 13,000.

Awards

Works

 Frédéric Bazille – approximate date
 Family Reunion
 The Little Gardener
 Portrait of Renoir
 George Henry Boughton – Pilgrims Going To Church
 William Burges – Narcissus washstand
 Giuseppe Calì – Death of Dragut (Museum of Fine Arts, Valletta)
 Julia Margaret Cameron – photographs
 Carlyle Like a Rough Block of Michael Angelo's Sculpture
 Profiles of Julie Jackson (her niece)
 Frederic Edwin Church – Niagara Falls, from the American Side
 Gustave Courbet – The kill of deer
 Edgar Degas – The Bellelli Family completed (Musée d'Orsay, Paris)
 Gustave Doré – engraved illustrations to Dante's Il Purgatorio ed il Paradiso
 Jean-Léon Gérôme
 Arnaut with two whippets
 The Death of Caesar
 Jerusalem, also known as Golgotha, Consumatum Est or The Crucifixion
 Napoleon in Egypt
 The runners of the Pasha
 Western Wall
 Artur Grottger
 Phryne
 Gustave Achille Guillaumet – The Sahara
 Francesco Hayez
 The Destruction of the Temple of Jerusalem
 Odalisque
 Frank Holl
 Convalescent
 Faces in the Fire
 Ivan Kramskoi – Self-portrait
 Sir Edwin Landseer
 Bronze lions for Nelson's Column
 The Wild Cattle of Chillingham
 Charles-Auguste Lebourg – Games of Love (terracotta)
 Frederic Leighton – Venus Disrobing for the Bath
 Édouard Manet
 L'Exposition universelle de 1867 ("The Universal Exhibition") (Nationalgalleriet, Oslo)
 The Races at Longchamp
 John Everett Millais – Sleeping
 Claude Monet
 Femme au jardin (Jeanne-Marguerite Lecadre in the Garden at Sainte-Adresse) (Hermitage Museum, Saint Petersburg)
 Garden at Sainte-Adresse  (Metropolitan Museum of Art, New York)
 Johannes Adam Simon Oertel – Rock of Ages
 Vasily Perov – The Drowned
 Edward Poynter – Israel in Egypt
 Val Prinsep
 Lisa (from Boccaccio's 'Decameron')
 Miriam Watching the Infant Moses
 Pierre-Auguste Renoir – Lise (with a Parasol)
 Simeon Solomon – Carrying the Scrolls of the Law
 Frederick Walker – Bathers
 James McNeill Whistler – Symphony in White, No. 3

Births
 January 17 – Louise Upton Brumback, American landscape painter (died 1929)
 February 19 – Emília dos Santos Braga, Portuguese painter (died 1949)
 March 8 – William de Leftwich Dodge, American muralist (died 1935)
 March 10 – Leonard Raven-Hill, English illustrator (died 1942)
 March 25 – Gutzon Borglum, American artist and sculptor (died 1941)
 April 8 – Allen Butler Talcott, American painter (died 1908)
 April 10 – George William Russell, Irish critic, poet and painter (died 1935)
 May 12 - Frank Brangwyn, Welsh painter (died 1956)
 June 8
 Dagny Juel, Norwegian muse (murdered 1901)
 O'Galop (Marius Rossillon), French cartoonist (died 1946)
 July 5 – Max Jakob Friedländer, German-born curator and art historian (died 1958)
 July 8 – Käthe Kollwitz, German graphic artist and sculptor (died 1945)
 August 26 – Viktor Foerster, Czech painter and mosaic artist (died 1915)
 September 9 – Ernst Oppler, German painter (died 1929)
 September 14 – Charles Dana Gibson, American graphic artist (died 1944)
 September 16 – Eva Watson-Schütze, American portrait photographer (died 1935)
 September 19 – Arthur Rackham, English illustrator (died 1939)
 October 3  – Pierre Bonnard, French painter (died 1947)
 October 15 - Fujishima Takeji, Japanese painter (died 1943)
 November 4 - Henry Charles Fehr, British sculptor (died 1940)
 Undated – Florence Fuller, South African-born Australian painter (died 1946)

Deaths
 January 4 – Marianne Ehrenström, Swedish writer, singer, painter, pianist, culture personality and memorialist (born 1773)
 January 14 – Jean Auguste Dominique Ingres, French Neoclassical painter (born 1780)
 February 10 – Carl Wagner, German Romantic landscape painter (born 1796)
 February 28 – Jacques Raymond Brascassat, French painter (born 1804)
 March – Kazimierz Jelski, Polish architect and sculptor (born 1782)
 March 3 – J. L. Lund, Danish painter especially of historical subjects (born 1777)
 March 6 – Peter von Cornelius, German painter (born 1784)
 April 15 – Adelaide Ironside, Australian painter (born 1831)
 May 18 – Clarkson Frederick Stanfield, English marine painter (born 1793)
 September 15 – Alexis Joseph Depaulis, French sculptor and medallist (born 1792)
 December 4 – Sophie Fremiet, French painter (born 1797)
 December 22 – Théodore Rousseau, French landscape painter (born 1812)
 December 27 – Antoine Claudet, French photographer and artist (born 1797)
 December 29 – Carlo Marochetti, Italian-born sculptor (born 1805)
 date unknown
 Luo Bingzhang, Han Chinese official, military general, calligrapher and devout Confucian scholar (born 1793)
 James Pollard, English painter and aquatint engraver especially of coach, fox hunting and equine scenes (born 1792)

 
Years of the 19th century in art
1860s in art